"Gospel Plow" (also known as "Hold On" and "Keep Your Hand on the Plow") is a traditional African American spiritual. It is listed in the Roud Folk Song Index, number 10075.  The title is biblical, based on Luke 9:62.

The earliest date in which this spiritual appears in written form is in 1917, in the Cecil Sharp Collection, while the earliest recording is from 1930 under the title of "Keep Yo' Hand on the Plow, Hold On"  by the Hall Johnson Negro Choir.

Like most African American spirituals, Gospel Plow can be defined as a "musical poem, not attributable to any specific poet or composer" that describes some aspect of the "early Afro-American's view of life." 

The allusion to the plow makes clear reference to the enslaved condition of African Americans working in the fields. Presumably, this spiritual must have been a message of encouragement connected to Luke 9:62's teaching that to keep plowing is to be fit for the kingdom of God.

Lyrics
There is no one official version of the lyrics of this song, such as is the case with many traditional spirituals and folk songs in general whose authorship is unknown. Perhaps the most famous rendition of Gospel Plow is Bob Dylan's in 1962:

Another famous rendition of the song is under the name of "Keep Your Hand on the Plow" by gospel singer and civil rights activist Mahalia Jackson. The lyrics are slightly different:

The structure of Jackson's rendition is interesting because it does not follow the traditional spiritual composition format of four-line stanzas in the aaab or aaba rhyme scheme. Instead, it is composed in three-line stanzas that follow the aab rhyme scheme which might be attributed to being a gospel adaptation of the traditional spiritual form of the song.

This song must have been an important one for Jackson, considering that the title of one of the chapters of her autobiography Movin' On Up is precisely "Keep your hand on the plow." In this chapter, she makes reference to pushing through during times of physical exhaustion after her tour through Europe.
Recordings
  Hall Johnson Negro Choir - Keep Yo' Hand on the Plow, Hold On - 1930
  Duke Ellington at the 1958 Newport Jazz Festival
  The Folksmiths, including Joe Hickerson - We've Got Some Singing To Do 1958
  Odetta on Odetta at Carnegie Hall 1961
 Clara Ward and Her Singers 1962
  Bob Dylan on his self-titled debut album 1962
  Peggy Lee - 2 Shows Nightly 1968
  Screaming Trees - Dust 1996
  Old Crow Medicine Show - Greetings from WAWA - 2000
  The Hackensaw Boys - Look Out - 2007
  Charlie Parr - Keep Your Hands On The Plow - 2011
  Uncle Sinner - Ballads and Mental Breakdowns - 2008
  Elizabeth Cook - Gospel Plow - 2012
  Moses Hogan - The Moses Hogan Choral Series 2003: This Little Light of Mine
   Slim Cessna's Auto Club - Always Say Please & Thank You (2000)
  Chance McCoy - Chance McCoy and the Appalachian String Band (2008) 
 Vondie Curtis-Hall 2019 Official soundtrack Harriet

Published versions
  Alan Lomax and John A. Lomax Our Singing Country 1941 (pp 44–45)

See also
Keep Your Eyes on the Prize

References 

Bob Dylan songs
Year of song unknown
African-American spiritual songs
Songwriter unknown